Adrian Cosentini  is an American mastering engineer, who specializes in audio restoration.

Career

Adrian Cosentini has mastered a variety of recordings in the field of audio restoration. He is the head of Audio Transformations LLC.

Over several decades, he has mastered and restored recordings that include Big Broadcast: Jazz and Popular Music of the 1920s and 1930s and The Wizard of Oz: Vintage Recordings from the 1903 Broadway Musical, transferring from analogue to digital.

He has also worked for the New York Philharmonic as a recording engineer and audio preservation manager. He has also worked for the New York Public Library.

Other clients Adrian Cosentini has taken on projects for include the Library of Congress and The Museum of Television and Radio.

Awards and nominations

At the 46th Annual Grammy Awards in 2004, Adrian Cosentini was nominated for Best Historical Album for his work mastering Vintage Recordings From The 1903 Broadway Musical The Wizard Of Oz.

References

External links
 Audio Transformations
 IMDB profile 
 All Music guide profile 

Mastering engineers
American audio engineers
People from New York City
People from Queens, New York
People from Bayside, Queens
St. John's University (New York City) alumni
Living people
American people of Italian descent
American people of French descent
Year of birth missing (living people)